Gongala is a mountain in the Ratnapura District of Sri Lanka.

Folklore
The name of Gongala means Cow Rock. According to folklores, the shape of this mountain top is the shape of a cow head. Another folklores is, a long time ago, many cows were live around Gongala mountain range.

See also 
 List of mountains of Sri Lanka

References 

Mountains of Sri Lanka
Landforms of Ratnapura District